Cold Showers is a 2005 French drama film directed by Antony Cordier. It was a Directors' Fortnight Selection at 2005 Cannes Film Festival. The film tells the story of three teenagers, a girl, Vanessa, and two boys, Mickael and Clement, who face changes and problems over a period of three months as they enter adulthood. The film attracted controversy on its release due to the full-frontal nudity of several young French actors.

Plot
Mickaël (Johan Libereau) is from a poor working class family - his father Gérard (Jean-Philippe Ecoffey) is a taxi cab driver who lost his license and then his job as a result of a police roadblock targeting drivers under the influence of alcohol. His mother Annie (Florence Thomassin) works as a cleaning woman in the high school gym: After this they have a tough time financially. Not a great student, Mickaël excels in judo and his life is focused on his sport and on his judo coach and girlfriend Vanessa (Salomé Stévenin). One of Mickaël's teammates Clément (Pierre Perrier) is from a wealthy family: his father Louis Steiner (Aurélien Recoing) uses a wheelchair and his mother Mathilde (Claire Nebout) is a woman of the world and society. Louis decides to sponsor the judo team, buys them outfits, and asks Mickaël to work with Clément to perfect his technique and prepare the judo team for a French championship.

Mickaël and Clément relate well and while Mickaël is a winning player, Clément is smarter and understands the intrinsic rules of the game better. An incident occurs that forces Mickaël to take the position of a wounded team mate and in doing so he must lose eight kilos to qualify for the championship team. The struggle to lose weight (he is already in ideal physical condition) places stress on both Mickaël and his family and teammates. Mickaël and Vanessa include Clément in their camaraderie, a situation which evolves into a ménage à trois as the three have group sex in the after hours gym. Vanessa reacts as though this is the greatest physical feeling ever, Clément is smitten, and Mickaël has troubling doubts. When the three decide to try it again in a hotel room Mickaël is so conflicted that he does not join the other two, only listening to their cavorting in the bathtub feeling inferior to the smarter, wealthier Clément. But on the judo side, the team plays the championship and Mickaël's delicate sense of self worth is restored for a moment. It is the manner in which the trio of teenagers resolve their antics that closes the film.

Cast
 Johan Libéreau as Mickael
 Salomé Stévenin as Vanessa
 Pierre Perrier as Clément
 Florence Thomassin as Annie
 Jean-Philippe Ecoffey as Gérard
 Aurélien Recoing as Louis Steiner
 Claire Nebout as Mathilde Steiner
 Julie Boulanger as Valentine
 Steve Tran as Tranh
 Denis Falgoux as The coach
 Magali Woch as Mickael's sister
 Camille Japy as Coach's wife
 Dominique Cabrera as The nurse
 Sarah Pratt as the examiner

Soundtrack
The soundtrack for this film contains songs by Julie Delpy and Galt MacDermot. The score is composed by Nicolas Lemercier. The main song of the film is called "Central Park".

Awards and nominations
César Awards 
 Nominated:
 Best First Film
Prix Louis Delluc
 Won
 Best First Film
Taipei International Film Festival 
 Won:
 Grand Prize
Verona International Film Festival 
 Won:
 Grand Prize 
Marseille Film Festival 
 Won:
 Critic Prize
French Press Golden Star 
 Won:
 Best First Film 
French Syndicate of Cinema Critics 
 Won:
 Best Promising Actor - Johan Libéreau 
Moulins Film Festival 
 Won:
 Best Actress - Florence Thomassin 
La Ciotat Film Festival 
 Won:
 Best Actress - Salomé Stévenin

References

External links
 
 

2005 drama films
2005 martial arts films
2005 LGBT-related films
2005 films
2000s coming-of-age drama films
French coming-of-age drama films
French LGBT-related films
Gay-related films
LGBT-related coming-of-age films
LGBT-related drama films
Louis Delluc Prize winners
2000s French films
Judo films